Ethmia galactarcha is a moth in the family Depressariidae. It was described by Edward Meyrick in 1928. It is found on Java, Sumatra, Flores and Sumbawa.

References

Moths described in 1928
galactarcha